Brachionostylum is a monotypic genus of flowering plants in the aster family, Asteraceae, containing the single species Brachionostylum pullei. It is endemic to New Guinea.

References

Monotypic Asteraceae genera
Endemic flora of New Guinea
Senecioneae